Stina Mårtensson (3 June 1882 – 1962) was a Swedish missionary. She served with the Swedish Missionary Society in Chinese Turkestan (present day Xinjiang) and India.

Mårtensson was born in Ovanåker in Hälsingland, Sweden. She worked as a nurse midwife in Yarkand and Kashgar for more than 22 years in various periods during the years 1907–1936. From 1939 until 1946 she worked in India. She died in Sweden 1962 at the age of 80.

See also
Mission and Change in Eastern Turkestan (English Translation of select chapters of Mission och revolution i Centralasien)
Margareta Hook Homepage (archived ~2012) has some pictures.
Missionskyrkan 2003 contains article that mentions her

Swedish Protestant missionaries
Protestant missionaries in China
Christian medical missionaries
Christian missionaries in Central Asia
1882 births
1962 deaths
Female Christian missionaries
Swedish midwives
Protestant missionaries in India
Swedish expatriates in China
Swedish expatriates in India